Maunabo Leones is a Puerto Rican soccer team which plays in Maunabo. The team plays in the Liga Nacional de Fútbol de Puerto Rico.

2008 season
The team finished the season with a record of 7-1-1.  Their only loss came to Guayanilla Pumas.

Liga Nacional
Defeated Yabucoa Borikén 2-1 in their first game.

Current squad

References

Puerto Rico Soccer League 2nd Division
Liga Nacional de Fútbol de Puerto Rico teams
Maunabo, Puerto Rico